Staithgate, also called Staygate, is a community in the City of Bradford, West Yorkshire, England. The postcode serving Staithgate: BD6. The community is near the M606 motorway.

Commerce
There are now more than forty registered businesses in the industrial estate, There is a high number of home businesses.

Geography
(2.0 mi²) of it is land and (0.14 mi²) of it (5%) is water.
The boundaries on Rooley Avenue to the north, M606 motorway to the east, Low Moor to the south, village of Odsal to the west.

Demographics
Often, many of the people who live in this sort of postcode will be middle income, older couples. These are known as type 33 in the ACORN classification and 3.14% of the UK's population live in this type.

Transport
Distances to major travel hubs are:
Railway station: Bradford Interchange – 1.74 miles 
Coach station: Bradford Interchange – 1.62 miles 
Airport: Leeds Bradford Airport – 7.95 miles 
Ferry port: Heysham Port – 50.86 miles

Access to the motorway network is provided at the roundabout of A6036 road and A6177 road, where the M606 motorway starts.

References

Areas of Bradford